is a Japanese women's professional shogi player ranked 1-dan. She is a member of the Ladies Professional Shogi-players' Association of Japan.

Early life
Isotani was born on March 22, 2002, in Narashino, Chiba Prefecture. Her mother  and aunt  are retired women's professional shogi players.

Promotion history
Isotani has been promoted as follows:
 2-kyū: November 1, 2018
 1-dan: November 20, 2018

Note: All ranks are women's professional ranks.

References

2002 births
Living people
People from Narashino
Japanese shogi players
Women's professional shogi players
Professional shogi players from Chiba Prefecture
LPSA